Paul Tamm (10 September 1900 Avinurme Parish (now Mustvee Parish), Kreis Dorpat – ?) was an Estonian politician. He was a member of II Riigikogu. He was a member of the Riigikogu since 26 June 1924. He replaced Andres Nõmme. On 1 October 1924, he resigned his position and he was replaced by Peeter Jakobson.

References

1900 births
Year of death missing
People from Mustvee Parish
People from Kreis Dorpat
Workers' United Front politicians
Members of the Riigikogu, 1923–1926